The Diocese of Mikkeli is one of nine dioceses in the Evangelical Lutheran Church of Finland. It was founded in 1897 in the town of Savonlinna. Later, in 1924 the episcopal see was moved to Viipuri, but after Finland lost the city to the Soviet Union, the see was moved to Mikkeli in 1945. It has since been located there.

Bishops of Mikkeli
Bishops of Savonlinna 1897–1924
Gustaf Johansson 1897–1899
Otto Immanuel Colliander 1899–1924
Bishops of Viipuri 1924–1945
Erkki Kaila 1925–1935
Yrjö Loimaranta 1935–1942
Ilmari Salomies 1943–1945
Bishops of Mikkeli 1945–
Ilmari Salomies 1945–1951
Martti Simojoki 1951–1959
Osmo Alaja 1959–1978
Kalevi Toiviainen 1978–1993
Voitto Huotari 1993–2009
Seppo Häkkinen 2009–

See also
Evangelical Lutheran Church of Finland

References 

Lutheran districts established in the 19th century
Mikkeli